The Elizabeth Murphy House is an American System-Built Home (ASBH), Model A203, designed by Frank Lloyd Wright, and located in the Village of Shorewood near Milwaukee, Wisconsin. The house takes its name from Elizabeth Murphy, wife of loan broker Lawrence Murphy, who purchased a lot as an investment on which to build the house speculatively,  and who contracted with Herman F. Krause, Jr., a carpenter, to build the house in 1917 according to plans supplied by Frank Lloyd Wright via Wright's marketing agent for ASBH projects, the Arthur L. Richards Company.

A lawsuit and liens filed in 1919 reveal that construction took longer and cost more than expected.
 For example, Krause sued the Murphys for unpaid invoices and the Murphys countered by claiming incomplete work. The architect is named as final decision-maker for changes suggested by the contractor to hold down costs, but absence of correspondence suggests that he was not consulted. Despite the trouble, the home's dimensions and layout are exact matches to the architect's drawings, although it was constructed in a mirror image to accommodate lot proportions and the relationship to neighboring houses.

The lot and home were sold by Elizabeth Murphy to Alfred and Gladys Kibbie in 1919 for $5,200 dollars. Since the Kibbies purchased the house before the lawsuit was settled, they were also named a defendants. The suite was eventually dropped. The Kibbie family lived in the house until 1941 when it was advertised as a Frank Lloyd Wright-designed bungalow and priced to sell for $5,300. The house changed hands again in 1971 and 1993. For reasons still unclear, the house's architectural lineage was lost along the way. When it was purchased in 1993, the buyers suspected it to be a "special" design, but did not know who designed it.

The house is a one story cottage with two bedrooms and one bath, a breakfast nook, a large open living area with a brick fire place and an open-air (since enclosed) sleeping porch.

The floorpan and most of the interior are undisturbed and in original form. The interior includes birch trim with the original rubbed-shellac finish, dining and kitchen cabinets and leaded art-glass doors, windows and light screens with a simple motif that may represent a flower or a tree. Modifications include shingles over the original exterior pebble-dash stucco, double pane-glass windows where there were once single panes, and the excavation of a garage where there was once a crawl space under the sleeping porch.

Plan records for ASBH Model A203 are held in the Frank Lloyd Wright Foundation Archives (1082.001). A drawing from a brochure page shows model A201 as featuring a flat roof, model A202 with a gabled roof, and A203 with a hip roof.

In 2015, onsite and records completed by Michael P. Lilek, the then Curator of American System-Built Homes with Frank Lloyd Wright Wisconsin, Inc., re-confirmed the house as a Wright design and deemed it the "Elizabeth Murphy House," based on the practice that Wright homes be named for the original buyer.

The house was featured as a stop on the 2017 Wright and Like Tour, organized by Wright in Wisconsin. It is listed in the Fourth Edition of William A. Storrer's The Architecture of Frank Lloyd Wright, A Complete Catalog.

The Elizabeth Murphy House is a private residence.

References 

Frank Lloyd Wright buildings
Houses in Milwaukee County, Wisconsin